Eyralpenus quadrilunata is a moth of the family Erebidae. It was described by George Hampson in 1901. It is found in the Democratic Republic of the Congo, Ghana, Senegal, Sierra Leone and the Gambia.

References

 

Spilosomina
Moths described in 1901